Sucre is the constitutional capital of Bolivia.

Sucre may also refer to:

People
 Sucre family, a prominent Venezuelan political family
 Antonio José de Sucre (1795-1830), a South American independence leader
 Guillermo Sucre (1933–2021) Venezuelan poet
 Jesús Sucre, Major League Baseball catcher
 José Antonio Ramos Sucre (1890-1930) Venezuela poet
 Juan Manuel Sucre Figarella, Venezuelan general
 Leopoldo Sucre Figarella, Venezuelan politician
 Luis Alberto Sucre, Venezuelan historian

Fictional characters
 Fernando Sucre, a fictional Puerto Rican character from the US television series Prison Break

Places

Political divisions
Bolivia
 Sucre, Chuquisaca, a municipality in the department of Chuquisaca

Colombia
 Sucre Department, one of the 32 departments which make up the country
 Sucre, Cauca, a municipality in the department of Cauca
 Sucre, Sucre Department, a municipality in the department of Sucre

Ecuador
 Sucre Canton, a canton in the province of Manabí
 Sucre, Manabí, a town in the province of Manabí

Peru
 Sucre Province, in the Ayacucho Region
 Sucre District, in Celendín Province, Cajamarca Region 

Venezuela
 Sucre, Venezuela, one of the 23 states which make up the country
 Antonio José de Sucre, Venezuela a municipality in the state of Barinas
 Sucre, Aragua, a municipality in the state of Aragua
 Sucre, Bolívar, a municipality in the state of Bolívar
 Sucre, Falcón, a municipality in the state of Falcón
 Sucre Municipality, Mérida, a municipality in the state of Mérida
 Sucre Municipality, Miranda, a municipality in the state of Miranda
 Sucre, Portuguesa, a municipality in the state of Portuguesa
 Sucre Municipality, Sucre, a municipality in the state of Sucre
 Sucre, Táchira, a municipality in the state of Táchira
 Sucre, Trujillo, a municipality in the state of Trujillo
 Sucre, Yaracuy, a municipality in the state of Yaracuy
 Sucre, Zulia, a municipality in the state of Zulia

Locations
 Juana Azurduy de Padilla International Airport, also known as Sucre Airport
 Roman Catholic Archdiocese of Sucre of Bolivia

Animals
 Sucre spiny rat
 Sucre antpitta, a bird

Organizations
 Sucré, a bakery in New Orleans, United States
 Sucré (band), an American musical group
 Sucre F.C., a former football (soccer) team
 University of Sucre, in Colombia

Economics
 Ecuadorian sucre, Ecuador's former currency
 SUCRE, a virtual currency of the Bolivarian Alliance for the Americas

Other uses
 "Sucre", French for sugar
 "Sucre à la crème", a Quebecois confectionery
 Sucre Cathedral
 Mission Sucre,  Venezuelan social program

See also
 Sucre Municipality (disambiguation)
 Universitario de Sucre, aka U de Sucre, a soccer team
 AeroSucre, cargo airline
 Mariscal Sucre International Airport, Ecuador
 Old Mariscal Sucre International Airport, Ecuador
 Mariscal Sucre Airport (Venezuela)
 Estadio Antonio José de Sucre
 Sugar